Joe Jacob (born 1 April 1939) is a former Irish Fianna Fáil politician.

Jacob was born in Kilrush, County Clare in 1939. He was educated at De La Salle in Wicklow and Terenure College in Dublin. He is a former publican and a distribution manager with Nitrigin Éireann Teoranta.

Jacob was first elected to Dáil Éireann as a Fianna Fáil Teachta Dála (TD) for the constituency of Wicklow at the 1987 general election. He held his seat at each subsequent election, until retiring at the 2007 general election.

Jacob was a member of Wicklow County Council from 1985 to 1997 for the Wicklow area. He was appointed a Minister of State at the Department of Public Enterprise with special responsibility for Energy in 1997, a post he held until 2002. He was not re-appointed to a ministerial position after the 2002 general election. He was Chairman of the Fianna Fáil parliamentary party from 1992 until 1995 and served as Leas-Cheann Comhairle of the Dáil from 1993 until 1997.

Jacob caused controversy in 2001 when, during a radio interview on The Marian Finucane Show as the minister responsible, he demonstrated an apparent lack of knowledge over the use of iodine tablets and the emergency plans in the event of a terrorist attack similar to the 11 September attacks in the United States.

References

 

1939 births
Living people
Fianna Fáil TDs
Local councillors in County Wicklow
Members of the 25th Dáil
Members of the 26th Dáil
Members of the 27th Dáil
Members of the 28th Dáil
Members of the 29th Dáil
Ministers of State of the 28th Dáil
People from Kilrush
Politicians from County Clare